Prey Touch is a khum (commune) of Moung Ruessei District in Battambang Province in north-western Cambodia.

Villages

 Koun Khlong
 Dob Krasang
 Phum Thmei
 Prey Touch
 Prean Nil
 Stueng Chork

References

Communes of Battambang province
Moung Ruessei District